Methven railway station served the village of Methven, Perth and Kinross, Scotland and was located between the city of Perth to the east and the town of Crieff to its west.  It was the western terminus of the Perth, Almond Valley and Methven Railway line and opened on 1 January 1858.

History
In 1866, the line was extended westwards all the way to Crieff by the Crieff and Methven Junction Railway and to the south of Methven, a junction and platform was constructed, named appropriately Methven Junction railway station.  This newer stop was renamed 'Methven Junction Halt' on 27 September 1937, coinciding with the closure of Methven Station to passenger traffic. Passenger trains continued running between Perth and Crieff until 1 October 1951, but during their last fourteen years, no longer deviated the short distance north to Methven Station.  Goods trains however, did continue to visit the station until complete line closure arrived on 25 January 1965.
Nowadays, the site of Methven Station is occupied by a small industrial estate and only the presence of Station Road in the village gives any hint of the railways ever having visited here.

References

Disused railway stations in Perth and Kinross
Former Caledonian Railway stations
Railway stations in Great Britain opened in 1858
Railway stations in Great Britain closed in 1937